Andhaman Kaidhi is a 1952 Indian Tamil-language crime drama film directed by V. Krishnan and written by Ku. Sa. Krishnamurthy. Starring M. G. Ramachandran, it is based on Krishnamurthy's play of the same name. The film was released on 14 March 1952.

Plot 
In the opening sequence, jailed former labour leader Nataraj is telling his cellmates about the suffering his family endured as a result of his uncle Ponnambalam betraying his fellow Indians in order to help the British. Nataraj tells of how Ponnambalam murdered his father, swindled his mother of her meager savings and forced her sister Leela into marriage. Nataraj hunts down and kills his uncle, which lands him in jail to tell his story.

Circa 1947. Ponnambalam helps himself to the properties and riches of his brother-in-law Chidambaram Pillai, who is settled in faraway Karachi. Ponnambalam is aided by his sidekick Jambu and the court clerk Muniyandi. When Chidambaram Pillai returns home and starts questioning Ponnambalam, he is killed.

In the aftermath of India Pakistan partition, Chidambaram Pillai's family manages to escape from the strife torn Karachi. His wife, son Natarajan and daughter Leela reach their hometown, only to find Chidambaram Pillai dead. They are driven away by the heartless Ponnambalam. An honest youth Balu, who is moved by their plight and offers them shelter in his house and falls in love with Leela. Natarajan who took pity for Vallikannu, who had been a victim of Ponnambalam's lust, soon turns to love.

Jambu gets Natarajan arrested on trumped up charges, and succeeds in getting Leela married to Ponnambalam. Leela pretends to be haunted by a ghost, and manages to postpone consummating the coerced marriage. But Jambu sees through her pretences and makes bold to molest her. Balu rushes to save Leela from her ordeal, but when he reaches her house, he finds Leela torn and bruised, and Ponnambalam is lying dead. Balu is charged with the murder and arrested.

Cast 
 M. G. Ramachandran as Nataraj
 Thikkurissy Sukumaran Nair as Balu
 K. Sarangapani as Ponnambalam
 S. D. Subbulakshmi as Kamatchi
 P. K. Saraswathi as Leela
 M. S. Draupadhi as Vallikannu
 T. S. Balaiah as Jambu
 T. N. Sivathanu as the cook in Ponnambalam's household

Production 
Andhaman Kaidhi was a play written by Ku. Sa. Krishnamurthy, first staged in 1938. When it was adapted into a film produced by Radhakrishna Films, Krishnamurthy was retained as screenwriter. The film was originally directed by K. Subramanyam who left, resulting in cinematographer V. Krishnan taking over direction. Newsreel footage of Indian Independence Day celebrations was added to the beginning of the film. M. G. Ramachandran was credited by his real name, rather than "Ramchandar" that was prevailing in many of his previous films in the late 1940s.

Soundtrack 
The music was composed by G. Govindarajulu Naidu. All the lyrics were by Ku. Sa. Krishnamurthy except the song "Kaani Nilam Vendum Paraasakthi", based on a song written by poet Subramania Bharati. The song "Anju Rooba Nottai Konjam Munne Maatthi", sung by T. V. Rathnam, revolves around the poor masses who suffer from economic disparity.

Release 
Andhaman Kaidhi was released on 14 March 1952. According to historian Randor Guy, the film was not a major success but helped Ramachandran "move up the ladder of success".

References

Bibliography

External links 

1950s Tamil-language films
1952 films
Films set in the partition of India
Indian crime drama films
Indian films based on plays
1952 crime drama films